The 2019 European Masters Games is the fourth edition of the multi-sport event for masters sport, scheduled to take place between 26 July – 4 August 2019 in Turin in Italy. It featured 28 sports, mostly for people aged 35 and above, although some disciplines will allow younger athletes to participate.

Sports
https://www.torino2019emg.org/en/all-sport/ 

Archery 
Athletics 
Badminton
Basketball
Beach volleyball
Canoe kayak
Shooting Clay Target 
Shooting Pistol&Rifle
Cycling
Dancesport
Fencing
Field Hockey
Floorball
Football
Futsal
Golf
Handball
Judo
Karate
Paddle
Rowing
Softball
Swimming
Taekwondo
Tennis
Triathlon and Duathlon
Volleyball
Weightlifting

Cancel sports
Climbing
Orienteering
Wakeboard

Paralympic Sports
https://www.torino2019emg.org/en/paralympic-sports/ 

During the European Masters Games Torino 2019 for disabled athletes it will be possible to participate in the disciplines of the following sports:
Archery
Athletics
Swimming

For further details, please consult the disability codes listed in the specific sport guides.

Results
 https://www.torino2019emg.org/en/results/
 https://web.archive.org/web/20191103111502/https://www.torino2019emg.org/en/results/

References

Results
 https://torino2019emg.org/en/

External links
 https://web.archive.org/web/20190516202710/https://www.torino2019emg.org/en/
 https://www.imga.ch/en/events 

Masters Games
European Masters Games
European Masters Games
Multi-sport events in Italy
International sports competitions hosted by Italy